The 2022–23 season is Milton Keynes Dons' 19th season in their existence, and the club's fourth consecutive season in League One. The club will also compete in the FA Cup, EFL Cup and EFL Trophy.

The season covers the period from 1 July 2022 to 30 June 2023.

Managerial change
On 11 December 2022, head coach Liam Manning was sacked by the club, with club captain Dean Lewington taking over as interim manager whilst a permanent replacement was sought. Goalkeeper David Martin became acting assistant manager alongside, with Bradley Johnson also taking charge of the team for their EFL Cup fixture on 20 December while Lewington underwent hamstring surgery.

On 23 December 2022, it was announced that Mark Jackson had been appointed as the club's new head coach.

Pre-season friendlies
On 3 June, MK Dons announced their first two pre-season friendlies, against AFC Rushden & Diamonds and King's Lynn Town. A third, against Barnet was also confirmed.

All four of the club's pre-season friendlies took place away from Stadium MK due to the stadium being a host venue for UEFA Women's Euro 2022.

Competitions

Overall record

League One

League table

Results summary

Results by matchday

Matches
The league fixtures for the 2022–23 season were announced on 23 June 2022. The club's opening game of the season was away to Cambridge United on 30 July 2022 with the final game of the season being away at Burton Albion on 7 May 2023.

FA Cup

Matches

In the first round, MK Dons were drawn at home to either Yeovil Town or Taunton Town. A day later, Taunton Town beat Yeovil Town in a Fourth qualifying round replay. In the second round, the club were drawn away to fellow League One side Portsmouth.

EFL Cup

Matches

The club were drawn at home to Sutton United in the first round. In the second round, the club were drawn away to EFL Championship club Watford. In round three, the club were drawn at home to fellow League One side Morecambe. In the fourth round, the club were drawn at home to Premier League side Leicester City.

EFL Trophy

On 20 June, the initial Group stage draw was made, grouping MK Dons with Cheltenham Town and Walsall. Three days later, West Ham United U21s joined Southern Group C. MK Dons were then drawn at home to Newport County in the Round of 32, and away to Bristol Rovers in the Round of 16.

Matches

Player details
 Note: Players' ages as of the opening day of the 2022–23 season.

Transfers

Transfers in

Transfers out

Loans in

Loans out

References

External links 
 

Milton Keynes Dons
Milton Keynes Dons F.C. seasons